The Journal of Financial Econometrics is a peer reviewed academic journal of econometrics. It is published by Oxford University Press. Its editors are Allan Timmermann (UC San Diego) and Fabio Trojani (University of Geneva).

Abstracting and indexing 
The journal is abstracted and indexed by:
 Scopus
 EconLit
 Social Sciences Citation Index

According to the Journal Citation Reports, the journal has a 2020 impact factor of 3.225, ranking it 154/557 in the category "ECONOMICS".

References 

Oxford University Press academic journals
Economics journals
Econometrics journals